The Quai Saint-Michel and Notre-Dame is a 1901 oil on canvas painting by the French artist Maximilien Luce. Luce was part of the Neo-Impressionist movement between 1887 and 1897 and used the technique of employing separate dabs of color (divisionism), for the painting, which was one of ten he undertook of Notre Dame de Paris. The Musée d'Orsay in Paris, which holds the image , notes that this was painted by Luce when he was moving from his Neo-Impressionist period to his later Populist period. The Musée d'Orsay obtained the picture in 1981.

References 

1901 paintings
Paintings in the collection of the Musée d'Orsay
Notre-Dame de Paris
Churches in art